West Adams Preparatory High School is a secondary school in the Pico-Union neighborhood of Central Los Angeles, California.

The school is a part of the Los Angeles Unified School District and is operated by a nonprofit organization working in conjunction with LAUSD.  The organization, MLA Partner Schools (formerly called Mentor LA), also operates Manual Arts High School.

History
The school, which opened  in the fall semester of 2007, is divided into three smaller schools: 
Business, Arts (SOTA), and Invention, Design, Engineering & Architecture (IDEA).

Core programs include Advisory (a required course for every student, every year, learning about college and career opportunities) and "7 to 7" (an elongated school day offering enrichment opportunities for students and families before and after normal school hours).

Though West Adams is a LAUSD high school, it was designed in part by MLA Partner Schools, a nonprofit organization that now operates the school on a five-year performance contract with the LAUSD school board.

The school was originally opened to relieve the LAUSD's Belmont High School, Dorsey High School, Los Angeles High School, and Manual Arts High School.

Jamie Oliver's Food Revolution
Several episodes of Jamie Oliver's Food Revolution are centered on West Adams, with Oliver attempting to influence the food options available to the students.

References

External links

 West Adams Preparatory High School
 West Adams High, A Model For The Future?
 MLA Partner Schools Website

Los Angeles Unified School District
High schools in Los Angeles
Public high schools in California
Pico-Union, Los Angeles
2007 establishments in California